Panjgur Airport  is a domestic and partially International airport, located at Panjgur, Balochistan, Pakistan.

See also 
 List of airports in Pakistan
 Airlines of Pakistan
 Transport in Pakistan
 Pakistan Civil Aviation Authority

References

External links

Airports in Balochistan, Pakistan
Panjgur District